Erica Cunningham (born March 25, 1993) is a professional soccer player who is currently playing for FA Women's Championship side Blackburn Rovers. She has previously played professionally in Europe for FF Lugano, Zurich and IFK Norrkoping. Cunningham is best known for her athleticism, physical strength on the ball, and abilities to use both feet.

Youth career 
She played soccer for Santa Rosa United before moving to the Santa Rosa Junior College where she won the state championship. Cunningham transferred to study at the University of San Francisco and represent The USF Women's Soccer Club in the NCAA Division 1.

Club career 
Cunningham started her professional playing career with FF Lugano 1976 between 2017 and 2019 in the Swiss Women's Super League before transferring to rivals FC Zurich for the 2019/20 season. She played for Zurich in the 2019/20 UEFA Women's Champions League season.

On July 13, 2021, she was signed by Swedish Elitettan side, IFK Norrkoping.

On January 28, 2022, Cunningham was signed by Blackburn Rovers on a short-term contract ahead of the remainder of the 2021–22 FA Women's Championship season.

International career 
Cunningham is eligible to play for either The Republic of Ireland and Northern Ireland.

Personal life 
Cunningham can speak Chinese. She is of Mexican, Irish, and Nicaraguan decent.

References 

1993 births
Living people
American women's soccer players
Blackburn Rovers L.F.C. players
Women's association football forwards
Santa Rosa Junior College alumni
College women's soccer players in the United States
Women's Championship (England) players
American expatriate sportspeople in England
American expatriate sportspeople in Switzerland
FF Lugano 1976 players
Swiss Women's Super League players
Expatriate women's footballers in England
Expatriate women's footballers in Switzerland
Elitettan players
Expatriate women's footballers in Sweden
American expatriate sportspeople in Sweden
FC Zürich Frauen players